Robert Gordon McEwen (23 October 1926 – 24 January 1993) was an Australian rules footballer who played with North Melbourne in the Victorian Football League (VFL).

McEwen enlisted in the Royal Australian Air Force three weeks after his eighteenth birthday, serving from November 1944 until the end of World War II.

Notes

External links 

1926 births
1993 deaths
Australian rules footballers from Victoria (Australia)
North Melbourne Football Club players